Ricardo Carbajal Oteo (born October 17, 1968, in Mexico City) is a Mexican football manager and former player.

On 21 July 2020, Carbajal was presented as the manager of Liga de Balompié Mexicano side Industriales Naucalpan F.C.

External links

References

1968 births
Living people
Footballers from Mexico City
Querétaro F.C. footballers
Cruz Azul footballers
Atlante F.C. footballers
C.F. Monterrey players
Liga MX players
Mexican football managers
Lobos BUAP managers
Association football midfielders
Mexican footballers